Nísia Floresta is a municipality in the state of Rio Grande do Norte in the Northeast region of Brazil.

The municipality contains the Nísia Floresta National Forest, a  sustainable use conservation unit created in 2001.

See also
List of municipalities in Rio Grande do Norte

References

Municipalities in Rio Grande do Norte
Populated coastal places in Rio Grande do Norte